A selenide is a chemical compound containing a selenium anion with oxidation number of −2 (Se2−), much as sulfur does in a sulfide. The chemistry of the selenides and sulfides is similar. Similar to sulfide, in aqueous solution, the selenide ion, Se2−, is prevalent only in very basic conditions. In neutral conditions, hydrogen selenide ion, HSe−, is most common. In acid conditions, hydrogen selenide, H2Se, is formed.

Some selenides are reactive to oxidation by air.  Owing to the greater reducing power of selenide, metal selenides are more easily decomposed to the elements than are sulfides (tellurides are even more labile). Selenides of electropositive metals: such as aluminium selenide readily hydrolyse, even in moist air, evolving toxic hydrogen selenide gas.

Pure selenide minerals are rare, instead selenium tends to partially substitute for sulfide in many sulfide minerals.  The degree of substitution is only of commercial interest for copper sulfide ores, in which case selenium is recovered as a by-product of copper refining.  Some selenide minerals include ferroselite and umangite.

Reactions

Alkali metal selenides react with elemental selenium to give salts of polyselenide.

Quantum dots 

Metal selenide quantum dots and nanoparticles can be prepared by a variety of synthetic methods, many of which require high temperatures and hazardous precursor compounds.
The particles can be adapted for a variety of applications by varying the ligands coordinated to the positively-charged outer layer. Many ligand-exchange reactions are available for use, trading X, L, and Z-type ligands, the mechanism for which is still under study.

Applications 
Quantum dots based on metal selenides have been extensively for their distinctive spectral properties. Core-shell alloys of cadmium sulfide and selenide are of interest in imaging and phototherapy.

Examples
 Gallium(II) selenide
 Indium(III) selenide
 Sodium selenide
 Cadmium selenide
 Zinc selenide
 Lead selenide
 Copper selenide

See also 
 Sulfoselenide

References

External links
 Selenide Nanoparticles Used In Solar Energy Conversion.

 
Chalcogenides
Solar cells
Selenium(−II) compounds